The 15th Pan American Games were held in Rio de Janeiro, Brazil from 13 July 2007 to 29 July 2007.

Medals

Gold

Women's Team Competition: Ana María Rendón, Sigrid Romero and Natalia Sánchez

Men's Middleweight (– 81 kg): Eleider Alvarez

Men's Individual Time Trial: Santiago Botero
Men's Keirin: Leonardo Narváez
Women's Sprint: Diana Orrego
Women's Individual Pursuit: María Luisa Calle

Men's Distance: Jorge Cifuentes

Men's Team Competition: Miguel Rodríguez, Bernardo Samper, and Javier Castilla

Men's 62 kg division: Diego Fernando Salazar 
Men's 85 kg division: José Oliver Ruíz 
Women's 63 kg division: Leydi Solís 
Women's 69 kg division: Tulia Angela Medina 
Women's 75 kg division: Ubaldina Valoyes

Women's Freestyle (55 kg division): Jackeline Rentería

Silver

Women's 800 metres: Rosibel García

Men's Super Heavyweight (+ 91 kg): Óscar Rivas

Men's Team Pursuit: Carlos Alzate, Juan Pablo Forero, Arles Castro and Jairo Pérez
Men's Madison: Alexander González and José Serpa
Men's Points Race: José Pérez
Women's Points Race: María Luisa Calle

Men's 80 kg division: Gilbert Ocoro 
Women's 60 kg division: Ana Escandón

Men's Slalom: José Mesa

Men's Individual Competition: Jorge Hugo Giraldo 
Men's Horizontal Bars: Jorge Hugo Giraldo 
Men's Parallel Bars: Jorge Hugo Giraldo

Men's 81 kg division: Mario Valles

Women's Distance: Alexandra Vivas

Women's Singles: Mariana Duque 
Women's Doubles: Mariana Duque and Karen Castiblanco

Men's 69 kg division: Edwin Mosquera 
Women's 53 kg division: Ana Margot Lemos 
Women's 58 kg division: Rusmeris Villar

Men's Freestyle (66 kg division): Edison Hurtado

Bronze

Women's Individual Competition: Ana María Rendón

Men's 20 km Walk: Gustavo Restrepo
Women's 1500 metres: Rosibel García

Men's Team Sprint: Leonardo Narváez, Hernán Sánchez, and Marzuki Mejia

Men's 10m Platform Synchronized: Juan Urán and Víctor Ortega

Men's Foil: Carlos Rodríguez

Women's 70 kg division: Yuri Alvear

Men's Individual Competition: Miguel Rodríguez
Women's Team Competition: Silvia Angulo, María Isabel Restrepo and Catalina Pelaez

Men's 94 kg division: Wilmer Torres

Men's Freestyle (55 kg division): Fredy Serrano 
Men's Freestyle (74 kg division): Wilson Medina 
Men's Freestyle (84 kg division): Rodrigo Piedrahita

Results by event

Archery
Natalia Sánchez
Ana María Rendón
Sigrid Romero
Diego Alejandro Torres

Athletics

Men's Competition
Men's 200 metres
Daniel Grueso
Heat 4 — 20.92
Semifinal 1 — 20.96 → did not advance

Men's 5,000 metres
William Naranjo
Final — 13:56.45 → 7th place
Javier Guarín
Final — 14:27.89 → 8th place

Men's 10,000 metres
William Naranjo
Final — 29:13.93 → 7th place
Javier Guarín
Final — 30:02.59 → 9th place

Men's 20 km Walk
Gustavo Restrepo
Final — 01:24.51 → Bronze Medal
Luis Fernando López
Final — DSQ → no ranking

Men's 50 km Walk
Fredy Hernández
Final — 04:03.10 → 6th place

Men's Marathon
Diego Colorado
Final — 02:20.01 → 7th place

Men's High Jump
Gilmar Mayo
Final — 2.10m → 13th place

Men's Shot Put
Carlos García Córdoba
Final — 17.61m → 9th place

Men's Discus Throw
Julián Angulo
Final — 50.79m → 8th place

Men's Javelin Throw
Noraldo Palacios
Final — 71.14m → 5th place

Women's Competition
Women's 200 metres
Felipa Palacios
Heat 1 — 23.11
Semifinal 1 — 23.03
Final — 23.34 → 6th place
Darlenys Obregon
Heat 2 — 23.96
Semifinal 1 — 23.76 → did not advance

Women's 400 metres
María Idrobo
Semifinal 2 — 54.29 → did not advance

Women's 800 metres
Rosibel García
Semifinal 2 — 2:01.60
Final — 2:00.02 → Silver Medal

Women's 1,500 metres
Rosibel García
Final — 4:15.78 → Bronze Medal

Women's 5,000 metres
Bertha Sánchez
Final — 15:49.97 → 6th place

Women's 4 × 100 m Relay
Briggite Merlano, Felipa Palacios, Mirtha Brock, and Darlenys Obregon
Semifinal 2 — 44.53
Final — did not start → no ranking

Women's 100 m Hurdles
Briggite Merlano
Semifinal 1 — 13.35 → did not advance

Women's 3,000 m Steeplechase
Angela María Figueroa
Final — 10:14.92 → 6th place

Women's 20 km Walk
Sandra Zapata
Final — 01:43.44 → 6th place

Women's Marathon
Ruby Riativa
Final — 02:51.35 → 6th place

Women's High Jump
Caterine Ibargüen
Final — 1.87m → 4th place

Women's Javelin Throw
Zuleima Araméndiz
Final — 47.95m → 9th place

Women's Hammer Throw
Eli Johana Moreno
Final — 62.77m → 8th place

Basketball

Women's Team Competition
Preliminary Round (Group B)
Lost to United States (41-95)
Lost to Cuba (53-81)
Defeated Argentina (68-66)
Classification Matches
5th/8th place: Defeated Mexico (62-55)
5th/6th place: Defeated Argentina (59-58) → 5th place
Team Roster
Yaneth Arias
Luisa Atehortua
Elena Díaz
Laura Estrada
Mabel Martínez
Nancy Mesa
Glency Mosquera
Tathiana Mosquera
Monica Palacios
Yenny Pinilla
Heissy Robledo
Levis Torres

Bowling
Rocio Del Pilar
Paola Rocio Gomez
Jaime Andres Gomez
Jorge David Romero

Boxing
Eleider Álvarez
Darley Pérez
Óscar Rivas
William Urina
Ramiro Nose Rojas
Oscar Negrete
Deibis Blanco
Miguel Angel Escandón

Canoeing
Aura Maria Escamilla
José Miller Cabanzo
Carlos Andres Escamilla

Cycling

BMX
Andrea Zuluaga
Augusto Castro
Andres Eduardo Jimenez

MTB
Viviana Maya Tabares
John Jairo Botero
Mario Rojas

Track
María Luisa Calle
Diana Maria García
Carlos Alzate
Arles Castro
Juan Pablo Forero
Alexander González
Jairo Pérez
Hernán Sánchez
José Serpa
Leonardo Narváez
Marsuki Mejia

Road
Elizabeth Agudelo
Ana Paola Madriñan
Sandra Patricia Gómez
Santiago Botero
Libardo Niño

Diving
Diana Pineda
Juan Urán
Víctor Ortega

Equestrian
Marco Antonio Bernal
Carlos Hernando Ramírez
Ricardo Alberto Villa
Edgar Mauricio Ruiz

Fencing
Laskmy Lozano
Nancy Vanegas
Dimitri Clairet
Javier Orlando Suarez
Carlos Andres Valencia

Football

Men's Team Competition
Mauricio Acosta
Ricardo Chara
Julian Rojas
Miguel Angel Julio
Charles Monsalvo
Andrés Mosquera Guardia
Andrés Mosquera Marmolejo
Cristian Nazarith
Edgar Pardo
Charles Arley Quinto
José Gabriel Ramirez
Carlos Julio Ramos
James David Rodríguez
Junior Javier Romero
Ricardo Serna Medina
Santiago Trellez
Sebastian Carabalí
Edward Estivinson

Gymnastics
Jessica Gil
Natalia Sánchez
Bibiana Velez
Jorge Hugo Giraldo
James José Brochero
Deyvi Castellanos
Didier Lugo
Fabian Arley Meza
William Castellanos

Judo
Yuri Alvear
Lisseth Orozco
Yadinis Amaris
Any Cortez
Yulieth Sanchéz
Mario Valles

Karate
Ana Maria Escandón
Gilber Ocoro

Roller Skating
Laura Catalina Zapata
Diego Duque
Jennifer Caicedo
Alexandra Vivas
Jorge Cifuentes
Oswaldo Aramis

Sailing
Paula Douat
Juan Camilo Bustos
Nicolás Deep
Sebastián Higuera
Camilo Marmol
Andrey Quintero
Monica Villegas

Shooting
Amanda Cuellar
Adriana Rendón
Paola Murillo
Natalia Tobar
Diego Duarte Delgado
Danilo Caro
Jorge Enrique Peralta
Luis Alfredo Reina
Héctor Libardo Devia
Hernando Ignacio Vega
Carlos Fernando Solís

Softball

Women's Team Competition
Yadira Conrado
Beatriz Cudriz
Eugenia Fernandez
Monica García
Melisa García
Vianys García
Durley Giraldo
Kerling Guzmán
Livis Hurtado
Ketty Milian
Ana Pusey
Zunilda Mendoza
Ana Olivo
Janey Peñata
Yomara Olivero
Luz Pérez
Ibeth Pérez

Squash
Silvia Angulo
Catalina Pelaez
María Restrepo
Miguel Angel Rodríguez
Bernardo Samper
Javier Castilla

Swimming
Carolina Colorado
Camilo Becerra
Julio César Galofre
Carlos Viveros
Omar Pinzón

Synchronized Swimming
Asly Alegria
Margarita Betancourt
Jennifer Cerquera
Ingrid Cubillos
Maria Reyna
Zully Pérez
Ibeth Echeverry
Paula Arcila
Maritza Valencia

Table Tennis
Johana Araque
Paula Medina
Luisa Zuluaga

Taekwondo
Gladys Mora
Duwal Asprilla
Alcira Ortíz

Tennis
Karen Emilia Castiblanco
Mariana Duque
Viky Núñez
Pablo José González
Michael Quintero
Carlos Salamanca

Triathlon

Men's Competition
Jorge Arías
 1:53:53.76 — 10th place
Ricardo Cardeño
 did not finish — no ranking

Women's Competition
Fiorella D'Croz Brusatin
 2:05:53.79 — 18th place
Maria Morales
 did not finish — no ranking

Volleyball

Beach
Andrea Galindo
Claudia Galindo
Rafael Cabrales
Diego Naranjo

Water Polo

Men's Team Competition
Jhon Andrade
Nelson Bejarano
Elkin Buitrago
Sergio Correa
Juan Echeverry
Juan Giraldo
Germán Guarnizo
Iván Idárraga
Jairo Lizarazo
Alex Monroy
Jorge Montoya
Guillermo Reina
Jorge Soto Roldán

Water Ski
Maria Camila Linares
Natalia Hernández
José Fernando Mesa
Esteban Siegert

Weightlifting
Mercedes Pérez
Leydi Solís
Tulia Angela Medina
Ubaldina Valoyes
Rusmeris Villar
Ana Margot Lemos
Monica Picon
Diego Fernando Salazar
Sergio Rada
José Oliver Ruíz
Carlos Andica
Edison Angulo
Óscar Figueroa
Edwin Mosquera

Wrestling

Greco-Roman
Cristian Mosquera
Iván de Jesus

Freestyle
Jackeline Rentería
Gelmis Alzate
Fredy Serrano
Nelson García
Wilson Medina
Rodrigo Piedrahita
Arnulfo Hernández
Edison Hurtado

See also
Colombia at the 2008 Summer Olympics

References
Rio 2007 Official website 
Colombia at the 2007 Pan American Games

Nations at the 2007 Pan American Games
P
Colombia at the Pan American Games